Keira Ramshaw (born 12 January 1994) is an English footballer who plays as a midfielder or striker for FA Women's Championship club Sunderland. Ramshaw has spent her entire senior career with Sunderland, making her debut for the club in 2010, and was part of the club's promotion to the FA Women's Super League in 2014. Ahead of the 2018–19 FA Women's National League season, Ramshaw was made club captain.

Club career 
Ramshaw made her first team debut on 18 April 2010, coming on as a substitute in a 4–0 defeat to Everton in the FA Women's Premier League National Division.

She made her full debut away to Watford in the second game of the following season, in September 2010, going on to start 17 of her 19 games in all competitions in 2010–11, a season which saw the club crowned champions.

Ramshaw scored double figures in all competitions in both 2011–12 and 2012–13, with the club winning the FA Women's Premier League National Division in both seasons, seeing them total three titles in a row.

After the club's election to the newly formed FA Women's Super League 2 ahead of 2014, Ramshaw hit double figures in league play for the first time, as Sunderland ended the season as 2014 FA WSL 2 champions. Her 10 goals in 18 games made her the club's joined top scorer, with Beth Mead also scoring 10 league goals.

Ramshaw played less as a striker following promotion to the FA Women's Super League 1, playing across the midfield and as a wing-back. Despite regular game time, she failed to score a FA WSL 1 goal until the 2017-18 season, scoring the winner away at Yeovil Town in October 2017. She also scored a late winner against Aston Villa in February 2018 to send Sunderland into the Women's FA Cup quarter-finals. Ramshaw scored the club's last away goal in WSL 1, scoring in a narrow 2–1 defeat at Chelsea in May 2018.

Following the club's demotion to the FA Women's National League, Ramshaw was one of only four first team players to remain with the club for the 2018–19 season. She was officially announced as club captain on 14 August 2018. She scored her first of the season in the club's first win of the season, a 2–1 victory at Bradford City on match-day two.

She scored her first goal of the 2021-22 season in a 1-1 draw away at Crystal Palace.

International career 
Good form in Sunderland's league winning 2011–12 season saw Ramshaw, along with team-mate Beth Mead, be called up to the England women's under-19 squad for the 2012 UEFA Women's Under-19 Championship. She played in two 2nd round qualifiers as well as all three Group Stage games at the finals in Turkey.

Career statistics

Club 

* The FA Women's Premier League National Division became the second tier of English Women's Football following the foundation of the FA Women's Super League for the 2011 season.

Honours

Club 

 FA Women's Premier League National Division: 2010–11, 2011–12, 2012–13
 FA Women's Premier League Cup: 2012
 FA WSL 2: 2014

References

External links 
 

1994 births
Living people
Sunderland A.F.C. Ladies players
English women's footballers
Women's Super League players
FA Women's National League players
Women's association football midfielders
Footballers from Sunderland